Ella Augusta Hall (March 17, 1896 – September 3, 1981) was an American actress. She appeared in more than 90 films between 1912 and 1933.

Early years
Ella Augusta Hall was born in Hoboken, New Jersey on March 17, 1896. Her family moved to Hollywood in the early days of silent films so her mother could pursue an acting career. Her mother was May Hall, a struggling actress who never reached any level of notoriety.

Career 
Ella Hall's first credited film appearance was the lead role in the 1913 film Memories. Her career took off after that film, and she appeared in thirty-seven films from 1913 through the end of 1914. She had another thirty-nine film appearances from 1915 through 1919. She did not appear in another film until 1921. Her career had slowed considerably during this span of a two-year break, and she only starred in seven more films. Her best-known film was The Flying Dutchman, released in 1923, which was her final silent film. 

She had a minor appearance, uncredited, in the 1930 Cecil B. DeMille film Madam Satan, and her final film appearance in 1933, in The Bitter Tea of General Yen.

Personal life and death 
Ella Hall married actor Emory Johnson in 1919. They had four children together. Two of their children became actors – Ellen Hall and Richard Emory. She wed Charles Clow in October 1934, but the marriage was annulled on January 21, 1936, because Clow's divorce from his first wife had been set aside, making his marriage to Hall illegal.

She was residing in Los Angeles, California at the time of her death on September 3, 1981.

Selected filmography

References

External links

1896 births
1981 deaths
American film actresses
American silent film actresses
20th-century American actresses